The Kyrgyzstan Championship is the national ice hockey championship in Kyrgyzstan.

Champions
2016–17 Dordoi Ala-Too Naryn
2015-16 Arstan Shumkar Bishkek
2014-15 Arstan Shumkar Bishkek
2013–14 unknown
2012–13 Dordoi Ala-Too Naryn
2011–12 Arstan Shumkar Bishkek
2010–11 Gornyak Ak-Tuz
2009–10 Khan-Tengri Bishkek
2008–09 Khan-Tengri Bishkek
2007–08 Dordoi Ala-Too Naryn

References

External links
League profile on eurohockey.com
Kyrgyzstan Ice Hockey Federation

Ice hockey leagues in Asia
Sports competitions in Kyrgyzstan